Metro Walk is a transit oriented development in Downtown Richmond, California.

Metro Walk may also refer to:

Metro Walk (Delhi), a mall and amusement park in India
Metrowalk, a business district in the Philippines
MetroWalk Shopping Center, in Taoyuan, Taiwan